The 1977–78 Vancouver Canucks season was the team's eighth in the National Hockey League.

Offseason

Regular season

Final standings

Schedule and results

Playoffs

Player statistics

Awards and records

Transactions

Draft picks
Vancouver's draft picks at the 1977 NHL amateur draft held at the Mount Royal Hotel in Montreal, Quebec.

Farm teams
Tulsa Oilers

See also
1977–78 NHL season

References

External links

Vancouver Canucks seasons
Vancouver C
Vancouver